Kettell is a surname. Notable people with the surname include:

 John Kettell (c. 1639-c. 1676 or 1685 or c. 1690), early settler in Massachusetts
 Ralph Kettell (1563-1643), English college head
 Samuel Kettell (1800-1855), American author 
 Thomas Kettell (1811-1878), American political economist, editor and author